Patrocínio Paulista is a municipality in the state of São Paulo in Brazil. The population is 14,807 (2020 est.) in an area of 603 km². The elevation is 743 m.

Notable people
 

Jorge Falleiros (1898–1924), poet, teacher and journalist

References

Municipalities in São Paulo (state)